The men's 1000m one man kayak race was held between July 13–14.

Medalists

Results

Preliminary rounds
The winner of each heat advances to the finals, the others go to the semifinals.

Heat 1

Heat 2

Heat 3

Semi-finals

Semi Final 1
The top three finishers in each semifinal advance to the finals, the others are eliminated.

Semi Final 2

Finals

References
Bracket

Men's K1 1000 metres